The Kitchen Debate was a series of impromptu exchanges through interpreters between U.S. Vice President Richard Nixon, then 46, and Chairman of the Council of Ministers Nikita Khrushchev, 65, at the opening of the American National Exhibition at Sokolniki Park in Moscow on July 24, 1959. 

An entire house was built for the exhibition which the American exhibitors claimed that anyone in the United States could afford. It was filled with labor-saving and recreational devices meant to represent the fruits of the capitalist American consumer market. The debate was recorded on color videotape, and Nixon made reference to this fact; it was subsequently broadcast in both countries.

History
In 1959, the Soviets and Americans agreed to hold exhibits in each other's countries as a cultural exchange to promote understanding. This was a result of the 1958 U.S.–Soviet Cultural Agreement. The Soviet exhibit in New York City opened in June 1959, and Vice President Nixon was on hand the following month to open the U.S. exhibit in Moscow. Nixon took Soviet First Secretary Nikita Khrushchev on a tour of the exhibit. There were multiple displays and consumer goods provided by more than 450 American companies. The centerpiece of the exhibit was a geodesic dome that housed scientific and technical experiments in a  facility. The Soviets purchased the dome at the end of the Moscow exhibition. 

William Safire was the exhibitor's press agent, and he recounted that the Kitchen Debate took place in a number of locations at the exhibition, but primarily in the kitchen of a suburban model house that was cut in half for easy viewing. This was only one of a series of four meetings that occurred between Nixon and Khrushchev during the 1959 exhibition. Nixon was accompanied by President Eisenhower's younger brother Milton S. Eisenhower, former president of Johns Hopkins University.

Khrushchev surprised Nixon during the first meeting in the Kremlin when he protested the Captive Nations Resolution passed by the US Congress, which condemned the Soviet Union for its "control" over the "captive" peoples of Eastern Europe and called upon Americans to pray for those people. After protesting the actions of the U.S. Congress, he dismissed the new technology of the U.S. and declared that the Soviets would have all of the same things in a few years and then say "Bye bye" as they surpassed the U.S. 

Khrushchev criticised the large range of American gadgets. In particular, Khrushchev saw that some of the gadgets were harder to use than the traditional way. One of these devices was a handheld lemon juicer for tea. He criticized the device, saying that it was much easier to squeeze the juice out by hand and the appliance was unnecessary. Khrushchev asked Nixon if this device was standard in American kitchens. Nixon admitted some of the products had not hit the U.S. market, and were prototypes. Khrushchev satirically asked "Don't you have a machine that puts food into the mouth and pushes it down?", a reference to Charlie Chaplin's 1936 film Modern Times. Nixon responded that at least the competition was technological rather than military. Both men agreed that the United States and the Soviet Union should seek areas of agreement. 

The second visit occurred in a television studio inside the American exhibit. In the end, Khrushchev stated that everything that he had said in their debate should be translated into English and broadcast in the U.S. Nixon responded, "Certainly it will, and everything I say is to be translated into Russian and broadcast across the Soviet Union. That's a fair bargain." Khrushchev vigorously shook hands to this proposal.

Nixon argued that the Americans built to take advantage of new techniques, while Khrushchev advocated for Communism by arguing that the Soviets built for future generations. Khrushchev stated, "This is what America is capable of, and how long has she existed? 300 years? 150 years of independence and this is her level. We haven't quite reached 42 years, and in another 7 years, we'll be at the level of America, and after that we'll go farther." Safire reported that Leonid Brezhnev was present and attempted to obstruct his photos.

The third visit occurred inside the kitchen on a cutaway model home that was furnished with a dishwasher, refrigerator, and range. It was designed to represent a $14,000 home that a typical American worker could afford.

Television broadcast and American reaction
The three major American television networks broadcast the Kitchen Debate on July 25, 1959. The Soviets subsequently protested, as Nixon and Khrushchev had agreed that the debate should be broadcast simultaneously in America and the Soviet Union, with the Soviets threatening to withhold the tape until they were ready to broadcast. The American networks, however, had felt that the delay would cause the news to lose its immediacy. The debate was broadcast on Moscow television on July 27, albeit late at night and with Nixon's remarks only partially translated.

American reaction was mixed. The New York Times called it "an exchange that emphasized the gulf between east and west but had little bearing on the substantive issue" and portrayed it as a political stunt. The paper also declared that public opinion seemed divided after the debates. Time magazine, on the other hand, praised Nixon, saying that he "managed in a unique way to personify a national character proud of peaceful accomplishment, sure of its way of life, confident of its power under threat."

Nixon gained popularity because of the informal nature of the exchange, improving upon the lukewarm reception that he previously had with the American public. According to William Safire, he also impressed Khrushchev: "The shrewd Khrushchev came away from his personal duel of words with Nixon persuaded that the advocate of capitalism was not just tough-minded but strong-willed."

The trip raised Nixon's profile as a public statesman, greatly improving his chances of receiving the Republican presidential nomination the following year. Khrushchev in a 1961 meeting with Nixon's opponent in the ensuing election, John F. Kennedy, would joke that he had voted for Kennedy.

In the Kitchen Debate, Khrushchev claimed that Nixon's grandchildren would live under communism and Nixon claimed that Khrushchev's grandchildren would live in freedom. In a 1992 interview, Nixon commented that at the time of the debate, he was sure Khrushchev's claim was wrong, but Nixon was not sure that his own assertion was correct. Nixon said that events had proven that he was indeed right because Khrushchev's grandchildren (Khrushchev's son Sergei Khrushchev was a naturalized American citizen) now lived in freedom, referring to then recent collapse of the Soviet Union.

Radiation incident

Secret Service records declassified by the National Security Archive (Washington D.C.) on September 22, 2022 reveal that the Soviets exposed Vice President Richard Nixon and his wife, Pat, to ionizing radiation during their visit to Moscow in July 1959. The Nixon couple was slightly exposed when residing in the Spaso House, the U.S. ambassador's residence in Moscow. The U.S. Secret Service special agent James O. Golden and another agent John T. Sherwood accidentally detected the radiations when checking their instruments in the Spaso House near the Vice President room for preparing a visit at an "atomic city" near Sverdlovsk, foreseen later in the Nixon tour of industrial cities. Two teenager students, Michael Gill and Richard Berke, family friends of James Golden, rapidly published the story to a limited audience in their school newspaper called "Black & White" at the Walt Whitman High School in Bethesda, Maryland. In 1976, The Washington Post confirmed the story in a document declassified later in 2012.

See also
 Six Crises

References

External links

 The original color videotape recording,  and  
 A condensed version is available at TeachingAmericanHistory.org, a project of the Ashbrook Center at Ashland University
 A more complete version of the text is available.
 The Loss of Early Video Recordings – Article about the missing Kitchen Debate videotape

1959 in American politics
1959 in international relations
1959 in American television
Nikita Khrushchev
Political controversies in the United States
Political controversies
Richard Nixon
Soviet Union–United States relations
Political debates
July 1959 events in Europe
1959 in Moscow
1959 in Soviet television
Radiation accidents and incidents